Hans Dammers (8 August 1913 – 17 March 1944) was a German Luftwaffe military aviator during World War II. As a fighter ace, he was credited with 113 aerial victories claimed in an unknown number of combat missions. During his numerous ground attack missions he destroyed eleven aircraft, eight locomotives, 39 horse-drawn wagons, 34 trucks, three anti-aircraft emplacements and one armored reconnaissance vehicle.

Born in Scherpenberg near Moers, Dammers was trained as a fighter pilot and was posted to Jagdgeschwader 52 (JG 52—52nd Fighter Wing) in 1941. Fighting on the Eastern Front, he claimed his first aerial victory on 31 August 1941 during Operation Barbarossa, the German invasion of the Soviet Union. On 23 August 1942, Dammers was awarded the Knight's Cross of the Iron Cross for 58 aerial victories claimed. He was credited with his 100th aerial victory on 5 May 1943. He then served as an instructor with Ergänzungs-Jagdgruppe Ost, a supplementary fighter pilot training unit. In January 1944, he was posted to 9. Staffel (9th squadron) of JG 52. Dammers died on 17 March 1944 in a hospital at Stanislau from wounds sustained in a mid-air collision.

Career
Dammers was born on 8 December 1913 in Scherpenberg, present-day a borough of Moers, at the time in the Rhine Province of the German Empire. Following flight training as a fighter pilot, he was posted to the 7. Staffel (7th squadron) of Jagdgeschwader 52 (JG 52—52nd Fighter Wing), a squadron of III. Gruppe (3rd group) of JG 52, in the summer of 1941.

War against the Soviet Union
Following its brief deployment in the Balkan Campaign, III. Gruppe was ordered to Bucharest by mid-June. There, the unit was subordinated to the Luftwaffenmission Rumänien (Luftwaffe Mission Romania) and reequipped with the new, more powerful Messerschmitt Bf 109 F-4 model. On 21 June 1941, the Gruppe was ordered to Mizil in preparation of Operation Barbarossa, the German invasion of the Soviet Union. Its primary objective was to provide fighter protection for the oil fields and refineries at Ploiești. Prior to the invasion, Major Gotthard Handrick was replaced by Major Albert Blumensaat as commander of III. Gruppe. Blumensaat was then replaced by Hauptmann Hubertus von Bonin on 1 October. At the time, von Bonin was still in convalescence so that Hauptmann Franz Höring, the commander of 9. Staffel, was also made the acting Gruppenkommandeur (group commander). On 27 August, III. There, Dammers claimed his first aerial victory on 31 August over a Polikarpov I-16 fighter aircraft. The following day, he was credited with another I-16 fighter shot down.

The Gruppe advanced to Poltava on 24 September. On 14 October, Dammers claimed his third aerial victory over another I-16 fighter. Three days later, he claimed an I-26 fighter, an early Luftwaffe designation for a Yakovlev Yak-1 fighter. On 23 October, III. Gruppe moved from Poltava to Chaplynka. The following day, he claimed a Polikarpov I-15 fighter aircraft near Ishun. On 2 November, the Gruppe moved to Taganrog where they stayed until 1 January 1942. During this period, Dammers claimed two I-16 fighters on 6 December, another I-16 fighter on 9 December, and his last claim in 1941, a further I-16 fighter, on 27 December.

On 29 April, III. Gruppe had relocated to Zürichtal, a small village at the Inhul in the former German settlement west of Feodosia in the Crimea. On 1 May, the Gruppe was subordinated to VIII. Fliegerkorps and was supporting the 11th Army in the Battle of the Kerch Peninsula. That day, he claimed his first aerial victory of 1942 and tenth in total when he shot down a Mikoyan-Gurevich MiG-1 fighter. Operating from Zürichtal, Dammers claimed eight further aerial victories, increasing his total to 18 victories claimed. On 12 May III. The next day, Dammers claimed three aerial victories over MiG-1 fighters in the combat area of Staryi Saltiv on the Donets. Over the next weeks, III. Gruppe was moved several times. On 19 May, the Gruppe moved to Barvinkove where they stayed until 12 June mostly fighting over the encircled Soviet forces in the Izium salient. Here, Dammers claimed an Ilyushin Il-2 ground-attack aircraft and three Petlyakov Pe-2 bombers on 26 May.

The Grupp was then ordered to Belgorod and to Grakowo, located approximately halfway between Kharkov and Kupiansk, on 22 June. That day, Dammers became an "ace-in-a-day" for the first time when shot down five Soviet fighter aircraft. On 28 June, German forces had launched Case Blue, the strategic summer offensive in southern Russia. On 7 July, Army Group A began their advance towards the oil fields in the Caucasus. On 10 July, Dammers was awarded the German Cross in Gold. Three days later, III. Gruppe moved to an airfield at Luhanske. There on 17 July, Dammers (flying Bf 109 G-2 Werknummer 13435—factory number) and his wingman Unteroffizier Kurt Keser jumped Soviet Yakovlev Yak-1 fighter pilot (then Starshiy Leytenant) Aleksandr Pokryshkin, but the future second highest scoring Soviet ace managed to shoot both down. Keser was killed and Dammers bailed out.

On 19 July, III. Gruppe moved to Taganrog, staying there until 29 July. Dammers continued his successes, shooting down two Lavochkin-Gorbunov-Gudkov LaGG-3s on 28 July, and on 6 August 1942 he claimed an Polikarpov I-153 biplane fighter and two LaGG-3s. Dammers was awarded the Knight's Cross of the Iron Cross on 23 August 1942, nominated after 51 aerial victories. The presentation was made by Hermann Graf. On 27 August, III. Gruppe reached an airfield named Gonschtakowka located north-northeast of Mozdok on the Terek. There Dammers became an "ace-in-a-day" for the second time on 5 September over five Curtiss P-40 Warhawk fighters which took his total to 63 aerial victories claimed. On 19 September, III. Gruppe reached an airfield named Soldatskaya, west of Mozdok. The Gruppe would remain here until 1 January 1943 but would also use airfields at Mozdok and Digora. Operating from Soldatskaya, Dammers increased his number of aerial victories to 75 by 18 September. By the end of 1942, his total number of aerial victories had increased to 89, making him the fourth most successful fighter pilot of III. Gruppe.

On 15 March 1943, Dammers' 7. Staffel was placed under the command of Oberleutnant Walter Krupinski. The Gruppe was moved to the combat area of the Kuban bridgehead on 1 April 1943 where it was based at an airfield at Taman. Operating from Taman until 2 July, III. Gruppe also flew missions from Kerch on 12 May, from Sarabuz and Saky on 14 May, Zürichtal, present-day Solote Pole, a village near the urban settlement Kirovske on 23 May, and Yevpatoria on 25/26 June. On 5 May 1943, Dammers was credited with his 100th aerial victory, claiming two LaGG fighters that day. He was the 39th Luftwaffe pilot to achieve the century mark.

Fighter pilot instructor and death

In May 1943, Dammers transferred to Ergänzungs-Jagdgruppe Ost, specialized training unit for new fighter pilots destined for the Eastern Front, as an instructor. On 23 July, he was severely injured in a ground accident when his Bf 109 overturned at Laleu Airfield. Following his recovery, he was transferred to 9. Staffel of JG 52, also known as the Karaya-Staffel, of JG 52 in January 1944. At the time, 9. Staffel was under the command of Oberleutnant Erich Hartmann. This Staffel was also subordinated to III. Gruppe of JG 52. Its commanding officer von Bonin had been replaced by Hauptmann Günther Rall on 5 July 1943.

III. Gruppe was based at Mala Vyska in early January 1944. On night of 9/10 January, the airfield was overrun by Soviet T-34 tanks and had to be abandoned in a hurry. The Gruppe stayed in Mala Vyska until 22 February when it withdrew to Uman. On 6 March, II. Gruppe headed to Kalynivka and to Vinnytsia on 8 March and then to Proskuriv on 12 March. There, Dammers claimed his last two aerial victories, a LaGG fighter on 12 March and another the following day.

Dammers' Bf 109 G-6 (Werknummer 20162—factory number) "yellow 9" was struck on 13 March 1944 by debris from a shot down Lavochkin La-5. Dammers bailed out but his parachute got caught on his wing. Dammers succumbed to his injuries and died in hospital on 17 March 1944 in Stanislau, present-day Ivano-Frankivsk. He was posthumously promoted to Leutnant (second lieutenant). Dammers was married to Gertrud Dammers, née Falkenburg. The couple had two sons, Manfred and Hans-Joachim.

Summary of career

Aerial victory claims
According to US historian David T. Zabecki, Dammers was credited with 113 aerial victories. Authors Obermaier and Spick also list Dammers with 113 aerial victories claimed in an unknown number combat missions, plus further 23 unwitnessed claims. In numerous ground attack missions, he destroyed eleven aircraft, eight locomotives, 39 horse-drawn wagons, 34 trucks, three anti-aircraft emplacements and one armored reconnaissance vehicle. Mathews and Foreman, authors of Luftwaffe Aces — Biographies and Victory Claims, researched the German Federal Archives and found records for 103 aerial victory claims, all of which claimed on the Eastern Front.

Victory claims were logged to a map-reference (PQ = Planquadrat), for example "PQ 06894". These sectors were then subdivided into 36 smaller units to give a location area 3 × 4 km in size.

Awards
 Honour Goblet of the Luftwaffe on 29 June 1942 as Unteroffizier and pilot
 German Cross in Gold on 10 July 1942 as Unteroffizier in the 7./Jagdgeschwader 52
 Knight's Cross of the Iron Cross on 23 August 1942 as Feldwebel and pilot in the 9./Jagdgeschwader 52

Notes

References

Citations

Bibliography

External links

1913 births
1944 deaths
People from Moers
Luftwaffe pilots
German World War II flying aces
Recipients of the Gold German Cross
Recipients of the Knight's Cross of the Iron Cross
Luftwaffe personnel killed in World War II
Military personnel from North Rhine-Westphalia